The white-browed shama (Copsychus luzoniensis) is a species of bird in the family Muscicapidae.
It is endemic to the Philippines. The Visayan shama (C. superciliaris), formerly considered a subspecies, was split as a distinct species in 2021.

References

white-browed shama
Endemic birds of the Philippines
Fauna of the Visayas
white-browed shama
Taxa named by Heinrich von Kittlitz
Taxonomy articles created by Polbot
Taxobox binomials not recognized by IUCN